Cinzano is a comune (municipality) in the Metropolitan City of Turin in the Italian region Piedmont, located about  east of Turin.

Cinzano borders the following municipalities: Casalborgone, Rivalba, Sciolze, Berzano di San Pietro, and Moncucco Torinese.

References

Cities and towns in Piedmont